St John the Evangelist's Church, also known as Lund Parish Church, is located on an isolated site near the village of Clifton, Lancashire, England.  It is an active Anglican parish church in the deanery of Kirkham, the archdeaconry of Lancaster, and the diocese of Blackburn.

History

The church was built in 1824–25, replacing an older church on the site, and designed by Robert Roper.  A chancel was added in 1852, possibly designed by Joseph Hansom.  The tower, designed by the Lancaster architects Paley and Austin, was built in 1873.  It is thought that the roof of the nave was replaced at this time, and Decorated tracery was installed in the windows.

Architecture

The plan of the church consists of a nave and chancel, without aisles, and a west tower.  The tower has an octagonal southeast stair turret, rising above the parapet of the tower.  Inside the church, the most notable feature is the font, which has been identified as a former Roman altar, probably moved here from a fort near Kirkham.  It is crudely carved with human figures.  The stained glass dates from the late 19th and early 20th century, and there are monuments dating from the 19th century.

See also

List of ecclesiastical works by Paley and Austin

References

Church of England church buildings in Lancashire
Diocese of Blackburn
Gothic Revival church buildings in England
Gothic Revival architecture in Lancashire
19th-century Church of England church buildings
Paley and Austin buildings
John the Evangelist, Clifton